George W. Wall House is a historic home located at Wallburg, Davidson County, North Carolina. It was built in 1896, and is a two-story, three bay by two-bay, vernacular Queen Anne style frame dwelling.  It features a deck-on-hip roof, decorative sawn woodwork, and a wraparound porch.

It was added to the National Register of Historic Places in 1984.

References

Houses on the National Register of Historic Places in North Carolina
Queen Anne architecture in North Carolina
Houses completed in 1896
Houses in Davidson County, North Carolina
National Register of Historic Places in Davidson County, North Carolina